During the 1978–79 English football season, Bristol City competed in the Football League First Division.

Season summary
Bristol City comfortably avoided relegation, finishing 13th in the First Division.

Kit
Bristol City's kit was produced by Umbro.

First-team squad

Awards
At the end of season, Gerry Gow was given the club's Player of the Season award.

References

Bristol City F.C. seasons
Bristol City F.C.